The candidate phyla radiation (also referred to as CPR group) is a large evolutionary radiation of bacterial lineages whose members are mostly uncultivated and only known from metagenomics and single cell sequencing. They have been described as nanobacteria (not to be confused with non-living nanoparticles of the same name) or ultra-small bacteria due to their reduced size (nanometric) compared to other bacteria.

Originally (circa 2016), it has been suggested that CPR represents over 15% of all bacterial diversity and may consist of more than 70 different phyla. However, 
the Genome Taxonomy Database (2018) based on relative evolutionary divergence found that CPR represents a single phylum, with earlier figures inflated by the rapid evolution of ribosomal proteins. CPR lineages are generally characterized as having small genomes and lacking several biosynthetic pathways and ribosomal proteins.  This has led to the speculation that they are likely obligate symbionts.

Earlier work proposed a superphylum called Patescibacteria which encompassed several phyla later attributed to the CPR group. Therefore, Patescibacteria and CPR are often used as synonyms. The former name is not necessarily obsolete: for example, the GTDB uses this name because they consider the CPR group a phylum.

Characteristics 
Although there are a few exceptions, members of the candidate phyla radiation generally lack several biosynthetic pathways for several amino acids and nucleotides.  To date, there has been no genomic evidence that indicates that they are capable of producing the lipids essential for cell envelope formation.  Additionally, they tend to lack complete TCA cycles and electron transport chain complexes, including ATP synthase.  This lack of several important pathways found in most free-living prokaryotes indicates that the candidate phyla radiation is composed of obligate fermentative symbionts.

Furthermore, CPR members have unique ribosomal features.  While the members of CPR are generally uncultivable, and therefore missed in culture-dependent methods, they are also often missed in culture-independent studies that rely on 16S rRNA sequences.  Their rRNA genes appear to encode proteins and have self-splicing introns, features that are rarely seen in bacteria, although they have previously been reported.  Owing to these introns, members of CPR are not detected in 16S-dependent methods. Additionally, all CPR members are missing the L30 ribosomal protein, a trait that is often seen in symbionts.

Many of its characteristics are similar or analogous to those of ultra-small archaea (DPANN).

Phylogeny 

The Candidate phyla radiation was found to be the most basal-branching lineage in bacteria according to some early phylogenetic analyses of this group based on ribosomal proteins and protein family occurrence profiles. These studies found the following phylogeny between phyla and superphyla. The superphyla are shown in bold.

However, several recent studies have suggested that the CPR belongs to Terrabacteria and is more closely related to Chloroflexota. The evolutionary relationships that are typically supported by these studies are as follows.

Provisional taxonomy 
Because many CPR members are uncultivable, they cannot be formally put into the bacterial taxonomy, but a number of provisional, or Candidatus, names have been generally agreed on. As of 2017, two superphyla are generally recognized under CPR, Parcubacteria and Microgenomates. The Phyla under CPR include:

 ?"Elulimicrobiota" Rodriguez-R et al. 2020
 Clade "Patescibacteria" Rinke et al. 2013
 "Wirthbacteria" Hug et al. 2016
 Microgenomates Cluster
 "Dojkabacteria" Wrighton et al. 2016 (WS6)
 "Katanobacteria" Hug et al. 2016b (WWE3) 
 Superphylum Microgenomates
 "Woykebacteria" Anantharaman et al. 2016 (RIF34)
 "Curtissbacteria" Brown et al. 2015
 "Daviesbacteria" Brown et al. 2015
 "Roizmanbacteria" Brown et al. 2015
 "Gottesmanbacteria" Brown et al. 2015
 "Levybacteria" Brown et al. 2015
 "Shapirobacteria" Brown et al. 2015
 Clade GWA2-44-7
 ?"Genascibacteria" He et al. 2021
 "Amesbacteraceaeia" Brown et al. 2015
 "Blackburnbacteria" Anantharaman et al. 2016 (RIF35)
 "Woesebacteria" Brown et al. 2015 (DUSEL-2, DUSEL-4)
 Clade UBA1400
 "Beckwithbacteria" Brown et al. 2015
 "Collierbacteria" Brown et al. 2015
 "Chazhemtonibacteraceae" corrig. Kadnikov et al. 2020
 "Chisholmbacteria" Anantharaman et al. 2016 (RIF36)
 "Cerribacteria" Kroeger et al. 2018
 "Pacebacteria" Brown et al. 2015
 Gracilibacteria Cluster
 "Absconditabacteria" Hug et al. 2016b (SR1)
 "Ca. Altimarinus" Rinke et al. 2013 (GN02)
 "Abawacabacteria" Anantharaman et al. 2016 (RIF46)
 "Peregrinibacteria" Brown et al. 2015 (PER)
 "Fertabacteria" Dudek et al. 2017 (DOLZORAL124_38_8)
 "Peribacteria" Anantharaman et al. 2016
 Saccharibacteria Cluster
 "Berkelbacteria" Wrighton et al. 2014 (ACD58)
 "Kazanbacteria" Jaffe et al. 2020 (Kazan)
 "Howlettbacteria" Probst et al. 2018 (CPR2)
 "Saccharibacteria" Albertsen et al. 2013 (TM7)
 Parcubacteria Cluster 
 "Andersenbacteria" Anantharaman et al. 2016 (RIF9)
 "Doudnabacteria" Anantharaman et al. 2016 (SM2F11)
 "Torokbacteria" Probst et al. 2018
 Clade ABY1
 "Kerfeldbacteria" Anantharaman et al. 2016 (RIF4)
 "Veblenbacteria" Anantharaman et al. 2016 (RIF39)
 ?"Brownbacteria" Danczak et al. 2017
 "Uhrbacteria" Brown et al. 2015 (SG8-24)
 "Magasanikbacteria" Brown et al. 2015
 "Kuenenbacteria" Brown et al. 2015
 "Jacksonbacteria" Anantharaman et al. 2016 (RIF38)
 "Komeilibacteria" Anantharaman et al. 2016 (RIF6)
 "Moisslbacteria" Probst et al. 2018
 "Falkowbacteria" Brown et al. 2015
 "Buchananbacteria" Anantharaman et al. 2016 (RIF37)
 Superphylum Parcubacteria
 ?"Montesolbacteria " He et al. 2021
 "Moranbacteria" Brown et al. 2015 (OD1-i)
 Clade UBA6257
 "Brennerbacteria" Anantharaman et al. 2016 (RIF18)
 "Wolfebacteria" Brown et al. 2015
 "Jorgensenbacteria" Brown et al. 2015
 "Liptonbacteria" Anantharaman et al. 2016 (RIF42)
 "Colwellbacteria" Anantharaman et al. 2016 (RIF41)
 "Harrisonbacteria" Anantharaman et al. 2016 (RIF43)
 Clade UBA9983_A
 ?"Hugbacteria" Danczak et al. 2017
 ?"Llyodbacteria" Anantharaman et al. 2016 (RIF45)
 "Vogelbacteria" Anantharaman et al. 2016 (RIF14)
 "Yonathbacteria" Anantharaman et al. 2016 (RIF44)
 "Nomurabacteria" Brown et al. 2015
 "Kaiserbacteria" Brown et al. 2015 
 "Adlerbacteria" Brown et al. 2015
 "Campbellbacteria" Brown et al. 2015
 "Taylorbacteria" Anantharaman et al. 2016 (RIF16)
 "Zambryskibacteria" Anantharaman et al. 2016 (RIF15)
 "Yanofskybacteria" Brown et al. 2015
 "Azambacteria" Brown et al. 2015
 "Sungbacteria" Anantharaman et al. 2016 (RIF17)
 "Ryanbacteria" Anantharaman et al. 2016 (RIF10)
 Clade UBA9983
 "Giovannonibacteria" Brown et al. 2015
 "Niyogibacteria" Anantharaman et al. 2016 (RIF11)
 "Tagabacteria" Anantharaman et al. 2016 (RIF12)
 "Terrybacteria" Anantharaman et al. 2016 (RIF13)
 "Spechtbacteria" Anantharaman et al. 2016 (RIF19)
 "Parcunitrobacteria" Castelle et al. 2017 (GWA2-38-13b)
 "Portnoybacteria" Anantharaman et al. 2016 (RIF22)
 Clade "Paceibacteria"
 "Wildermuthbacteria" Anantharaman et al. 2016 (RIF21)
 "Paceibacteria"
 "Nealsonbacteria" Anantharaman et al. 2016 (RIF40)
 "Gribaldobacteria" Probst et al. 2018
 "Staskawiczbacteria" Anantharaman et al. 2016 (RIF20)

The current phylogeny is based on ribosomal proteins (Hug et al., 2016). Other approaches, including protein family existence and 16S ribosomal RNA, produce similar results at lower resolutions.

See also 
  for some of the phyla in CPR.

References

External links
 Most of the Tree of Life is a Complete Mystery. We know certain branches exist, but we have never seen the organisms that perch there. by Ed Yong, April 12, 2016, atlantic.com.
 Ultra-Small, Parasitic Bacteria Found in Groundwater, Dogs, Cats — And You; on: SciTechDaily; July 21, 2020; source:  Forsyth Institute
 
 

Bacteriology
Candidatus taxa
Bacteria phyla